Entre Lunas (Between Moons) is ninth studio album recorded by Mexican performer Emmanuel, It was released by RCA Ariola in 1988 (see 1988 in music) The album became his second number-one set on the Latin Pop Albums chart and was nominated for Pop Album of the Year at the 1st Lo Nuestro Music Awards.

Track listing
 Grito De Dos
 Una Vieja Canción
 Qué Será
 La Noche Arde
 Esos Ojos
 La Última Luna
 Y La Lluvia Entro
 En La Noche
 Desesperado
 No Me Sientes

References

1988 albums
Emmanuel (singer) albums
RCA Records albums
Spanish-language albums
Albums produced by Rudy Pérez